Stefan Zogović (born 17 April 1990) is a Montenegrin football defender who plays for Cement Beočin.

Club career
Born in Nikšić, Zogović came through Vojvodina youth academy. He made his first senior appearances with Palić making 13 appearances with 1 goal in the 2008–09 Serbian League Vojvodina season. Shortly after he signed a contract with Vojvodina, He joined Vojvodina's first team for the 2009–10 Serbian SuperLiga season, but did not make any official appearances for the club. Although he was originally loaned to Slavija Sarajevo in summer 2010, Zogović spent the 2010–11 season with Palić and FK Novi Sad. Zogović moved to Sutjeska Nikšić in 2011, and after a six-month period as a loaned player, he signed a two-year deal with the club at the beginning of 2012. Playing with Sutjeska, Zogović won the Montenegrin First League for the 2012–13 season. After the end of contract with Sutjeska, Zogović returned to the Serbian SuperLiga side Donji Srem, being a member of the club until summer 2014. In summer 2014, Zogović returned to his home club Vojvodina, but moved on loan to the nearby Serbian First League club OFK Bačka straight away. After a one-year loan, Zogović returned to Vojvodina, but after he was not in Zlatomir Zagorčić's plans for new season, Zogović extended his loan deal at OFK Bačka. For two seasons with Bačka, Zogović collected 35 caps and scored 3 goals, helping the team to join the Serbian SuperLiga for the first time in the club history. After the end of the 2015–16 season, Zogović left the club. In summer 2016, Zogović signed a one-year new contract with Vojvodina, and moved on loan to ČSK Čelarevo shortly after. Zogović injured in the second fixture of the 2016–17 Serbian First League season, being substituted out during the match against Sinđelić Beograd on 20 August 2016 and later missed the rest of a season.

Style of play
As a 1.90 m tall defender, Zogović is physically dominant and powerful in the jump game. He usually operates as a centre-back being capable of playing as a right-back or as a midfielder in some occasions. He is also characterized by a great fighting spirit on the field.

Career statistics

Honours
Sutjeska Nikšić
Montenegrin First League: 2012–13

References

External links
 
 
 

1990 births
Living people
Footballers from Nikšić
Association football central defenders
Montenegrin footballers
FK Vojvodina players
FK Palić players
RFK Novi Sad 1921 players
FK Sutjeska Nikšić players
FK Donji Srem players
OFK Bačka players
FK ČSK Čelarevo players
FK Odžaci players
FK Cement Beočin players
Serbian First League players
Montenegrin First League players